Home Affairs is a South African television drama series created and produced by Roberta Durrant. It tells the story of nine very different women whose lives are interconnected.
The women's stories reflect the wide cultural range of South African women. The women each undertake a journey of self-discovery, connecting with each other in various and random ways.

Cast 
 Lerato Moloisane
 Nthati Moshesh
 Brenda Ngxoli
 Yonela Duze
 Bonnie Mbuli
 Sorisha Naidoo
 Therese Benade
 Jessica Haines
 Andrea Dondolo
 Vatiswa Ndara
 Nomsa Xaba
 Masello Motana
 Makgano Mamabolo
 Lali Dangazele
 Mbali Ntuli
 Antonio Lyons

References

External links 
 

South African drama television series
2005 South African television series debuts
Television shows set in South Africa